The Soviettes were a punk rock band from Minneapolis, Minnesota, founded in 2001. The group is composed of Annie (guitar), Sturgeon (guitar), Susy (bass guitar), and Danny (drums), all of whom share singing and songwriting duties.

History
Annie, originally from Fargo, ND, moved to Minneapolis in 1995 where she met Sturgeon. They started writing songs in 2001 and were joined by Susy shortly afterward with Lane Pederson on drums. The name originates from when Annie was serving coffee at a previous job, a customer offered "your band should be called The Soviettes" instead of a tip.
The band recorded their first EP, T.C.C.P., the same year. Soon Annie asked Danny to play with them permanently.

In 2003, The Soviettes released the first LP entitled LP on Adeline Records of Oakland, California.

In 2004, the band released their second LP entitled LP II, again on Adeline Records. The band was then noticed by Fat Wreck Chords in San Francisco, California and was shortly after signed with the label. The band released the song "Paranoia! Cha-Cha-Cha" for the compilation album Rock Against Bush, Vol. 1.

On June 28, 2005, the band's third LP entitled LP III was released on Fat Wreck Chords.

The members of The Soviettes had an association with the Minnesota RollerGirls with the single "Roller Girls" about the organization with backing vocals from some of the girls.

They toured the United States extensively. Their final tour was a 50 state tour at the end of 2005 with Fat Wreck label-mates Against Me!, the Epoxies, and Smoke or Fire.

Breakup
In 2006 the band went on hiatus indefinitely and, at the time, the members doubted the band would reform at all. 

"I don't know why we broke up," said Danny Henry in 2007, "It was pretty natural. Bands are relationships, they're just more complicated because it's a four-way deal."

Post Soviettes
Since The Soviettes' hiatus, Annie and Danny have continued playing music together as the punk rock duo The Awesome Snakes and later in Green/Blue. Sturgeon played in The Gateway District with Carrie (who also played with Sturgeon in The Salteens), as well as Nate from Banner Pilot and Brad from Dear Landlord (both of whom also played in Rivethead), and later formed Partial Traces also with Brad and Nate.  Annie also performs with Bermuda Squares and the God Damn Doo Wop Band, and sometimes performs with Sturgeon in Partial Traces.

In 2019, the online magazine Consequence named the Soviettes No. 93 on its list of the best 100 pop-punk bands of all time.

Reunions
The band reunited in 2010 for some shows.  The first was on March 18, 2010 at Eclipse Records in St. Paul, MN.  Next was March 19, 2010 at the Turf Club in St. Paul, MN.  Both shows were record release shows for their Rarities album, released for free on Red Sound Records.

They also played at the Soda Bar in San Diego, CA on Sept 4th, 2010 as part of "Awesome Fest 4".

On October 29, 2010 the band played at The Atlantic in Gainesville, FL as part of "Fest 9".

The band played 2 more shows in 2010, one at the Triple Rock Social Club, Minneapolis, MN on 11/12/2010 and another at Reggie's Rock Club, Chicago, IL on 11/13/2010, the latter opening for The Methadones on their final show.

The band was scheduled to participate in "Weasel Fest", supporting Screeching Weasel at Reggie's Rock Club, Chicago, IL on 05/29/2011 but dropped off the bill following Ben Weasel's behavior at SXSW 2011. They did play at the Triple Rock Social Club in Minneapolis on 05/27/2011.

The band also played a live show at San Francisco's Bottom of the Hill Club on August 31, 2011.

Members

Current members
Annie Sparrows - guitar, vocals
Susy Sharp - bass, vocals
Maren "Sturgeon" Macosko - guitar, vocals
Danny Henry - drums, vocals

Past members
Lane Pederson - drums
Mikey "Erg" Yannich - drums, vocals

Discography

Albums

EPs and singles

Splits

Compilations

Reception
"The Minneapolis quartet make songs that are loud, raw and clock in at under 2 minutes. They punch you in the gut and make you feel happy for the pain." (Rod Harmon, Sarasota Herald-Tribune)
"Every song on LP III is under three minutes long and recalls the upbeat antics of the Ramones and, more recently, the Donnas." (Jessica Grose, SPIN)
"The Soviettes are an instant party, and the second they hit the stage you've received your invitation. You can't help but get caught up in their immediate infectious energy." (Jason White, Thrasher)

References

External links 
 
 
 Lyrics at Wikia
 Biography at Fat Wreck Chords

Musical groups from the Twin Cities
Musical groups established in 2001
Fat Wreck Chords artists
American pop punk groups
Punk rock groups from Minnesota
Adeline Records artists
Musical groups disestablished in 2011
2001 establishments in Minnesota